The Howson Range is a north–south trending subrange of the Bulkley Ranges of the Hazelton Mountains in northern British Columbia, Canada. It is located southwest of Telkwa Pass and southwest of Smithers.

Mountains
Mountains in the Howson Range include:
Howson Peak, 
Pyrite Peak, 
Redemption Peak, 
Preterition Peak, 
Tattered Tower, 
Outcast Peak, 
Mount Felber, 
Polemic Peak, 
Mount Desdemona, 
Tom Thumb Peak, 
Lonesome Crag, 
Barrel Sides Peak, 
Utica Peak, 
Loft Peak, 
Delta Peak, 
Gamma Peak, 
Mount Othello, 
Mount Cassio,

References

Howson Range in the Canadian Mountain Encyclopedia

Hazelton Mountains